Roman Kutuzov may refer to:

 Roman Kutuzov (curler) (born 1986), Russian curler
 Roman Kutuzov (general) (1979–2022), Russian general